Jordan Taylor may refer to:

 Jordan Taylor (softball) (born 1988), American softball pitcher
 Jordan Taylor (basketball) (born 1989), American basketball point guard
 Jordan Taylor (racing driver) (born 1991), American sports car racing driver
 Jordan Taylor (American football) (born 1992), American football wide receiver
 Jordan Taylor (YouTuber) (born 1991), American YouTuber